Oombulgurri, also written as Umbulgara, was an Aboriginal community in the eastern Kimberley,  by air and about  by road northwest of Wyndham. it had a population of 107 as of the 2006 census. It was inhabited by the Yeidji people who now self-identify as Balanggarra. In 2011, the government of Western Australia encouraged residents of Oombulgurri to move elsewhere, after it deemed the community unsustainable. The last residents from Oombulgurri were relocated to Wyndham just before Christmas 2011. There is still a locality with this name that includes the surrounding area, which had a population of 27 at the 2021 census.

History

Mission establishment
The Anglican Forrest River Mission for Aborigines was founded in 1896–97 by Harold Hale but was abandoned after a few months. A permanent mission, known as the Forrest River Mission, was established on the site in 1913 by the bishop of the north west, Gerard Trower. In December 1913, Anglican priest Ernest Gribble took charge, three years after he was forced to resign as superintendent at Yarrabah. Gribble remained as superintendent until the early 1930s.

In 1926 the mission was plagued by an influenza epidemic and impacted by the Forrest River massacre where police killed a number of Aboriginal people.

The mission was closed in 1969, after the 1967 Aboriginal referendum.

In 1973, fifty Aboriginal people decided to resettle their abandoned tribal land and rename it Oombulgurri. Within a year, the population had grown to 200. Infrastructure and welfare programs were set up in the 1970s and 1980s to provide the residents with basic amenities and to allow the town to become self-sufficient.

Coronial inquest into Aboriginal deaths
In 2007 a coronial inquiry began into Aboriginal deaths in the Kimberley, including five in Oombulgurri. It revealed high levels of alcohol abuse, suicide and child neglect in Oombulgurri. Some time after the inquest, alcohol was banned there.

Child sex investigation
A police task force, Operation Sheepshank, began after a report was compiled on an alleged paedophile ring at the Aboriginal community of Kalumburu, in the Kimberley resulting in arrests of three men and a juvenile from Oombulgurri.

Closure
In October 2010, the government of Western Australia announced plans to close the community of Oombulgurri, as its population had decreased from 150 to less than 50. In February 2011, the government was reportedly considering a number of proposals about the community's future once all the residents had moved out, including converting it into a tourism retreat or a juvenile justice facility. On 1 March 2011, the community's only store was dismantled and removed by boat. As of 2 March 2011, only seven residents still remained in Oombulgurri. Shortly before Christmas of 2011, the remaining residents were relocated to Wyndham. In 2014 the state government demolished most of the buildings at the site, despite opposition by former residents and a campaign to prevent the demolition by Amnesty International Australia.

Access
There is an airstrip nearby for light aircraft.

Notes

References
Book review of related books. Retrieved 9 November 2005
Western Australian education records summary (pdf). Retrieved 9 November 2005
Guide to indigenous records(pdf file). Retrieved 9 November 2005
Wyndham/Oombulgurri parish. Retrieved 10 November 2005
Aboriginal Lands trust estate (pdf file). Retrieved 10 November 2005
Community development program. Retrieved 10 November 2005

Further reading
 

Ghost towns in Western Australia
1973 establishments in Australia
2011 disestablishments in Australia
Mission stations in Australia
Aboriginal communities in Kimberley (Western Australia)